The 2014 Georgia State Panthers softball team represented Georgia State University in the 2014 NCAA Division I softball season. The Panthers competed in the Sun Belt Conference and were led by four-year head coach Roger Kincaid. Georgia State played its home games at the Robert E. Heck Softball Complex in Panthersville, Georgia. This represented the first season of softball competition in the Sun Belt Conference.

Roster

Schedule 

! style="background:#0000FF;color:white;"| Regular Season
|- valign="top" 

|- align="center" bgcolor="#ccffcc"
| 1 || February 14 || Indiana || Bob Heck Field || 14-6 || 1-0 || -
|- align="center" bgcolor="#ccffcc"
| 2 || February 15 ||  || Bob Heck Field || 11-1 || 2-0 || -
|- align="center" bgcolor="#ffccc"
| 3 || February 15 ||  || Bob Heck Field || 3-5 || 2-1 || -
|- align="center" bgcolor="#ccffcc"
| 4 || February 16 || Indiana || Bob Heck Field || 4-3 || 3-1 || -
|- align="center" bgcolor="#ccffcc"
| 5 || February 16 ||  || Bob Heck Field || 11-5 || 4-1 || -
|- align="center" bgcolor="#ccffcc"
| 6 || February 21 ||  || Atlanta, GA || 3-2 || 5-1 || -
|- align="center" bgcolor="#ccffcc"
| 7 || February 22 || Stony Brook || Kennesaw, GA || 7-5 || 6-1 || -
|- align="center" bgcolor="#ffccc"
| 8 || February 22 ||  || Kennesaw, GA || 6-7 || 6-2 || -
|- align="center" bgcolor="#ffccc"
| 9 || February 23 || #21  || Atlanta, GA || 2-8 || 6-3 || -
|- align="center" bgcolor="#ffccc"
| 10 || February 23 ||  || Atlanta, GA || 1-5 || 6-4 || -
|- align="center" bgcolor="#ccffcc"
| 11 || February 26 ||  || Bob Heck Field || 17-3 || 7-4 || -
|- align="center" bgcolor="#ffccc"
| 12 || February 26 || Mercer || Bob Heck Field || 5-11 || 7-5 || -
|- align="center" bgcolor="#ccffcc"
| 13 || February 28 ||  || Clearwater, FL || 8-1 || 8-5 || -
|- align="center" bgcolor="#ccffcc"
| 14 || February 28 ||  || Clearwater, FL || 4-2 || 9-5 || -
|-

|- align="center" bgcolor="#ccffcc"
| 15 || March 1 ||  || Clearwater, FL || 10-2 || 10-5 || -
|- align="center" bgcolor="#ffccc"
| 16 || March 1 ||  || Clearwater, FL || 1-7 || 10-6 || -
|- align="center" bgcolor="#ccffcc"
| 17 || March 2 ||  || Clearwater, FL || 6-1 ||11-6 || -
|- align="center" bgcolor="#ffccc"
| 18 || March 9 ||  || Clinton, SC || 0-6 || 10-7 || -
|- align="center" bgcolor="#ffccc"
| 19 || March 9 || Presbyterian || Clinton, SC || 3-4 || 10-8 || -
|- align="center" bgcolor="#ffccc"
| 20 || March 12 ||  || Bob Heck Field || 9-16 || 10-9 || -
|- align="center" bgcolor="#ffccc"
| 21 || March 14 ||  || Myrtle Beach, SC || 0-7 || 10-10 || -
|- align="center" bgcolor="#ffccc"
| 22 || March 14 ||  || Myrtle Beach, SC || 0-2 || 10-11 || -
|- align="center" bgcolor="#ffccc"
| 23 || March 15 ||  || Myrtle Beach, SC || 1-5 || 10-12 || -
|- align="center" bgcolor="#ccffcc"
| 24 || March 15 || Coastal Carolina || Myrtle Beach, SC || 3-1 || 11-12 || -
|- align="center" bgcolor="#ffffff"
| 25 || March 16 ||  || Myrtle Beach, SC || Cancelled || - || -
|- align="center" bgcolor="#ccffcc"
| 26 || March 18 || Kennesaw State || Bob Heck Field || 7-5 || 12-12 || -
|- align="center" bgcolor="#ffccc"
| 27 || March 19 || #7  || Tuscaloosa, AL || 1-3 || 12-13 || -
|- align="center" bgcolor="#ffccc"
| 28 || March 22 || #20  || Bob Heck Field || 3-8 || 12-14 || 0-1
|- align="center" bgcolor="#ffccc"
| 29 || March 22 || #20 Louisiana || Bob Heck Field || 2-4 || 12-15 || 0-2
|- align="center" bgcolor="#ffccc"
| 30 || March 23 || #20 Louisiana || Bob Heck Field || 0-13 || 12-16 || 0-3
|- align="center" bgcolor="#ccffcc"
| 31 || March 25 || Kennesaw State || Kennesaw, GA || 8-0 || 13-16 || -
|- align="center" bgcolor="#ffccc"
| 32 || March 26 ||  || Bob Heck Field || 1-16 || 13-17 || 0-3
|- align="center" bgcolor="#ccffcc"
| 33 || March 29 ||  || Troy, AL || 6-4 || 14-17 || 1-3
|- align="center" bgcolor="#ffccc"
| 34 || March 29 || Troy || Troy, AL || 6-9 || 14-18 || 1-4
|- align="center" bgcolor="#ccffcc"
| 35 || March 30 || Troy || Troy, AL || 6-1 || 15-18 || 2-4
|-

|- align="center" bgcolor="#ccffcc"
| 36 || April 2 ||  || Greenville, SC || 9-1 || 16-18 || 2-4
|- align="center" bgcolor="#ffccc"
| 37 || April 2 || Furman || Greenville, SC || 6-7 || 16-19 || 2-4
|- align="center" bgcolor="#ffccc"
| 38 || April 5 ||  || Bob Heck Field || 1-3 || 16-20 || 2-5
|- align="center" bgcolor="#ccffcc"
| 39 || April 5 || UT-Arlington || Bob Heck Field || 6-4 || 17-20 || 3-5
|- align="center" bgcolor="#ccffcc"
| 40 || April 6 || UT-Arlington || Bob Heck Field || 4-1 || 18-20 || 4-5
|- align="center" bgcolor="#ccffcc"
| 41 || April 8 || Georgia Tech || Atlanta, GA || 10-5 || 19-20 || 4-5
|- align="center" bgcolor="#ffccc"
| 42 || April 9 ||  || Statesboro, GA || 2-5 || 19-21 || 4-5
|- align="center" bgcolor="#ccffcc"
| 43 || April 12 ||  || Bob Heck Field || 8-1 || 20-21 || 5-5
|- align="center" bgcolor="#ccffcc"
| 44 || April 12 || Texas State || Bob Heck Field || 10-2 || 21-21 || 6-5
|- align="center" bgcolor="#ccffcc"
| 45 || April 13 || Texas State || Bob Heck Field || 3-2 || 22-21 || 7-5
|- align="center" bgcolor="#ccffcc"
| 46 || April 15 ||  || Jacksonville, AL || 10-6 || 23-21 || 7-5
|- align="center" bgcolor="#ffccc"
| 47 || April 18 || #19  || Mobile, AL || 0-8 || 23-22 || 7-6
|- align="center" bgcolor="#ccffcc"
| 48 || April 18 || #19 South Alabama || Mobile, AL || 2-1 || 24-22 || 8-6
|- align="center" bgcolor="#ffccc"
| 49 || April 19 || #19 South Alabama || Mobile, AL || 1-2 || 24-23 || 8-7
|- align="center" bgcolor="#ccffcc"
| 50 || April 23 || #13  || Athens, GA || 4-2 || 25-23 || 8-7
|- align="center" bgcolor="#ccffcc"
| 51 || April 26 ||  || Monroe, LA || 3-1 || 26-23 || 9-7
|- align="center" bgcolor="#ccffcc"
| 52 || April 26 || ULM || Monroe, LA || 14-4 || 27-23 || 10-7
|- align="center" bgcolor="#ffccc"
| 53 || April 27 || ULM || Monroe, LA || 0-1 || 27-24 || 10-8
|-

|- align="center" bgcolor="#ccffcc"
| 54 || May 2 ||  || Bob Heck Field || 3-2 || 28-24 || 11-8
|- align="center" bgcolor="#ccffcc"
| 55 || May 3 ||  Western Kentucky || Bob Heck Field || 6-5 || 29-24 || 12-8
|- align="center" bgcolor="#ffccc"
| 56 || May 3 || Western Kentucky || Bob Heck Field || 7-9 || 29-25 || 12-9
|-

|- align="center" bgcolor="#ffccc"
| 57 || May 7 || ULM || Lafayette, LA || 1-2 || 29-26 || 12-9
|-

References 

Georgia State
Georgia State Panthers softball seasons